The list of Canadian provinces by unemployment rate are statistics that directly refer to the nation's seasonally adjusted unemployment rate. Below is a comparison of the seasonally adjusted unemployment rates by province/territory, sortable by name or unemployment rate. Data provided by Statistics Canada's Labour Force Survey. Not seasonally adjusted data reflects the actual current unemployment rate, while seasonally adjusted data removes the seasonal component from the information.

Unemployment by province or territory

Definitions of modern full employment range from 3% to 6% unemployment rates.

Data differences from US rates
Canada uses a different measure to gauge the unemployment rate than the United States calculation.   An analyst with the American Bureau of Labour Statistics stated that if the Canadian unemployment rate were adjusted to U.S. concepts, it would be reduced by 1 percentage point.

In Canada, 15-year-olds are included in surveys of the working age population and therefore are included in their calculations. In the United States, 15-year-olds are not included in the calculations. A larger contributor to the difference is that flipping through the want-ads in a newspaper (or on the internet) gets people classified as unemployed in Canada, but not in the United States. A rise in the use of these passive job search methods in Canada is important as an explanation for the methodology bump of +1% for the Canadian figures.

Unemployment extremes
The lowest level of national unemployment came in 1947 with a 2.2% unemployment rate, a result of the smaller pool of available workers caused by casualties from the Second World War.

The highest level of unemployment throughout Canada was set on December 1982, when the early 1980s recession resulted in 13.1% of the adult population being out of work due to economic factors that originated in the United States. The primary cause of the early 1980s recession was a contractionary monetary policy established by the Federal Reserve System to control high inflation.

During the Great Depression, urban unemployment throughout Canada was 19%; Toronto's rate was 17%, according to the census of 1931. Farmers who stayed on their farms were not considered unemployed.

References

Canadian provinces
Canada, unemployment rate